Donald Franciszek Tusk (born 22 April 1957) is a Polish politician who was president of the European Council from 2014 to 2019. He served as the 14th Prime Minister of Poland from 2007 to 2014 and was a co-founder and leader of the Civic Platform (Platforma Obywatelska) political party from 2003 to 2014. On 20 November 2019, Tusk was elected as the president of the European People's Party (EPP), Europe's largest transnational political party and on 3 July 2021 he returned to Polish politics by reassuming the leadership of the Civic Platform. 

Tusk has been involved in Polish politics since the early 1990s, having founded several political parties and held elected office almost continuously since 1991. Tusk was one of the co-founders of the free-market-orientated Liberal Democratic Congress party. He entered the Sejm (lower chamber of Poland's parliament) in 1991, but lost his seat in the 1993 election which went badly for the Congress.

In 1994, the Congress merged with the Democratic Union to form the Freedom Union. In 1997, Tusk was elected to the Senate, and became its deputy speaker. In 2001, he co-founded another centre-right liberal conservative party, Civic Platform (PO), and he was again elected to the Sejm, and became its deputy speaker.

He was candidate for president of Poland in the 2005 election then he was appointed prime minister in 2007. With his party's victory in the 2011 Polish parliamentary election, he became the first Prime Minister to be re-elected since the fall of communism in Poland. In 2014, he became president of the European Council and was re-elected to this position in 2017. He resigned as Polish prime minister to take the role, having been the longest-serving Prime Minister of the Third Polish Republic and the third longest-serving Prime Minister of Poland after Józef Cyrankiewicz and Piotr Jaroszewicz. Together with his long-time rival Jarosław Kaczyński, the highest ranked politicians on both the Polish center and right respectively, both have negative approval ratings for over 15 years.

Early life
Tusk was born in Gdańsk in northern Poland. He has Polish, German (maternal grandmother) and Kashubian ancestry. His father, also named Donald Tusk (1930–1972), was a carpenter, and his mother, Ewa (née Dawidowska) Tusk (1934–2009), was a nurse. The family's language was Danzig German. His grandfather, Józef Tusk (1907–1987), was a railway official who was imprisoned at the Neuengamme concentration camp; later, as a former citizen of the Free City of Danzig, he was apparently conscripted by German authorities into the Wehrmacht. Later on, he was successful in joining the Polish Armed Forces in the West.

Tusk has described the city of his youth as "a typical frontier town" with "many borders ... between ethnicities". This, together with his Kashubian ethnic ancestry and multilingual family, meant that he grew up with an awareness that "nothing is simple in life or in history", which informed his adult political view that it is "best to be immune to every kind of orthodoxy, of ideology and most importantly, nationalism". He has described his young life under communism as "so hopeless" due to the boredom and monotony, with "no hope for anything to change". His young self was a "typical hooligan" who often got into fights – "we would roam the streets, you know, cruising for a bruising."

Tusk credits his interest in politics to watching clashes between striking workers and riot police when he was a teenager. He enrolled at the University of Gdańsk to study history, and graduated in 1980. While studying, he was active in the Student Committee of Solidarity, a group that opposed Poland's communist rule at the time.

Early political career

Tusk was one of the founders of the Liberal Democratic Congress (Kongres Liberalno-Demokratyczny KLD), which in the 1991 elections won 37 seats in the lower house of parliament. The KLD later merged with the Democratic Union (UD) to become the Freedom Union (UW). Tusk became deputy chairman of the new party, and was elected to the Senate in the next election in 1997. In 2001, he co-founded Civic Platform, and became deputy speaker in parliament after the party won seats in the year's election.

2005 Polish presidential election

In the shade of the upcoming expiration of President Aleksander Kwaśniewski's second term and his inability to stand for a third term, Tusk and Lech Kaczyński were the leading candidates for the presidential elections. Although both leading candidates came from the centre-right, and their two parties had planned to form a coalition government following the parliamentary elections on 25 September, there were important differences between Tusk and Kaczyński. Tusk wanted to enforce a separation of church and state, favoured rapid European integration and supported a free-market economy. Kaczyński was very socially conservative, a soft Eurosceptic, and supported state intervention. Such differences led to the failure of POPiS coalition talks in late October. Jacek Protasiewicz headed his electoral campaign staff. Tusk's campaign motto was "President Tusk – A man with principles; We will be proud of Poland". In the election, Tusk received 36.6% of votes in the first round and then faced Kaczyński, who got 33.1% of votes in the first round.

In the second round, Tusk was defeated by Kaczyński.

One controversy during the election was the fact that Tusk's grandfather, Józef Tusk, had been a Nazi collaborator during WWII, having served in the German Wehrmacht during the war. The controversy, according to the BBC, "is believed to have influenced some voters negatively."

Prime Minister of Poland (2007–2014)

Tusk and his Civic Platform party emerged victorious in the 2007 Polish parliamentary election, defeating incumbent Prime Minister Jarosław Kaczyński's Law and Justice party with about 42% of the vote to Law and Justice's 32%. Tusk and his assembled cabinet were sworn in on 16 November, as he became the fourteenth prime minister of the Third Polish Republic.

In the 2011 Polish parliamentary election, Civic Platform retained their Parliamentary majority, giving Tusk a second term as Prime Minister and making him Poland's first PM to win reelection since the fall of communism. In September 2014, leaders of the European Union voted unanimously by selecting Tusk as Herman van Rompuy's successor for President of the European Council, which gave Poland its first European leadership position since the fall of the Berlin Wall. Tusk resigned as Prime Minister and was succeeded by Marshal of the Sejm Ewa Kopacz.

Domestic policy
During the 2007 parliamentary election campaign and initially when he entered office, Tusk promised to continue the free market policies, streamline the bureaucracy, enact long-term stable governance, cut taxes to attract greater foreign business ventures, encourage Polish citizens living overseas to return to Poland, and privatise state-owned companies. Later in office, Tusk changed his views on the role of taxation in the functioning of the state and his government never cut any taxes. Instead, it raised VAT from 22% to 23% in 2011, increased the tax imposed on diesel oil, alcohol, tobacco and coal, and eliminated many tax exemptions. The number of people employed in public administration also grew considerably. By 2012, the value of foreign investments in Poland had not matched the peak level attained in 2006–07, before Tusk entered office. The number of Poles living abroad in 2013 was almost the same level as in 2007.

During his government, Tusk oversaw Austerity programme.

The construction of a more adequate and larger national road network in preparation for the UEFA 2012 football championships was a stated priority for Tusk's government. On 27 October 2009, Tusk declared that he wanted to partially ban gambling. During the 2009 swine flu pandemic, Tusk defended his government's decision not to purchase swine flu vaccine, citing the lack of testing by pharmaceutical companies and its unavailability to be purchased freely through the market. Tusk criticised other nations' responses to the pandemic. "The eagerness of some countries seems to be excessive and disproportionate to the real epidemiological situation", Tusk stated, referring to the pandemic's relatively low fatality rate.

Tusk is moderately conservative on social issues. He is opposed to legalising abortion on demand, believing that current Polish legislation on abortion at that time (which allowed for legal abortion only when the pregnancy threatens the woman's life or health, when the foetus is seriously malformed, and when the pregnancy results from rape or incest) protected human life best. Tusk has publicly stated that he opposes euthanasia.

Foreign policy

In foreign policy, Tusk sought to improve relations severely damaged during the previous Kaczyński government, particularly with Germany and Russia. While he criticised the words of German politician Erika Steinbach with regard to her opinion over the expulsion of Germans from Poland following World War II, Tusk has stressed the need for warm relations with Berlin. Tusk also advocated a more realistic relationship with Moscow, especially in regard to energy policy. Under Tusk's premiership, Russian bans on Polish meat and agricultural products were lifted, while Poland reversed its official policy of disagreement on a European Union-Russian partnership agreement.

During a speech delivered to the Sejm in the first weeks of his premiership, Tusk outlined a proposal to withdraw military units from Iraq, stating that "we will conduct this operation keeping in mind that our commitment to our ally, the United States, has been lived up to and exceeded." The last Polish military units completed their withdrawal in October 2008.

In regard to U.S. plans of hosting missile defense shield bases in the country, Tusk hinted skepticism toward the project, saying that their presence could potentially increase security risks from Russia, and rejected U.S. offers in early July 2008. By August, however, Tusk relented, and supported the missile shield, declaring: "We have achieved the main goal. It means our countries, Poland and the United States will be more secure." Following President Barack Obama's decision to scrap and revise missile defense strategy, Tusk described the move as "a chance to strengthen Polish-US co-operation in defense..." He said: "I took this declaration from President Obama very seriously and with great satisfaction."

Tusk announced that Polish soldiers would not take military action in Libya, although he voiced support for the 2011 military intervention in Libya and pledged to offer logistical support.

Contrary to the condemnation of foreign governments and the leadership of the European Union, Tusk supported Hungarian Prime Minister Viktor Orbán in his efforts of implementing a new controversial constitution. Tusk stated that the Hungarian constitution's democratic controversies were "exaggerated" and that Hungary had "a European level standard of democracy". Tusk's support for the Hungarian government garnered a rare show of solidarity with the opposition Law and Justice, which also publicly displayed support for Orbán's efforts.

In early 2012, Tusk announced his support for committing Poland to signing the international Anti-Counterfeiting Trade Agreement (ACTA). In response, websites for the Chancellery, Sejm and Presidency were hacked in mid-January. Following Anonymous's claim of responsibility for the web attack, Tusk remained undeterred by internet protests, authorising the Polish ambassador in Japan to sign the agreement, yet promised that final legislation in the Sejm would not go ahead without assurances regarding freedom to access the Internet. Despite the government's guarantees, mass protests erupted in late January, with demonstrations held in Warsaw, Kraków, Wrocław and Kielce. Further web attacks were reported on the website of Foreign Minister Radek Sikorski.

European policy
In continental policy, Tusk strongly supported greater political and economic integration within the European Union, strongly backing the implementation of the Lisbon Treaty, standing in stark contrast to President Lech Kaczyński's vehement opposition. Tusk repeatedly stated his government's intention in bringing Poland into the Eurozone. Originally wanting to introduce the euro by 2012, Tusk envisaged in 2009 a starting year of 2015 as "a realistic and not overly-ambitious goal". However, during the European sovereign debt crisis, Tusk and his government displayed less optimism in joining the monetary union under contemporary economic circumstances, leading to Finance Minister Jan Vincent-Rostowski calling any move "unthinkable". Despite not being a member of the eurozone, Tusk pressed that Poland, along with the other non-eurozone states of the EU, should be included in future euro financial negotiations.

Between July and December 2011, Poland under Tusk's government presided over the Presidency of the Council of the European Union. Under its presidency tenure, Poland supported and welcomed Croatia's entry into the European Union through the Treaty of Accession 2011.

While being a constituent member of the Weimar Triangle with fellow states Germany and France, Tusk showed displeasure over German Chancellor Angela Merkel's and French President Nicolas Sarkozy's dominating roles in eurozone negotiations, remarking to Italian newspaper Corriere della Sera in January 2012 that "this should not translate into a lasting political monopoly: things cannot be left to only two capitals of Europe."

Constitutional reform

After being elected prime minister, relations between Tusk and President Lech Kaczyński were often acrimonious due to different political ideologies and the constitutional role of the presidency. Using presidential veto powers, Kaczyński blocked legislation drafted by the Tusk government, including pension reform, agricultural and urban zoning plans, and restructuring state television.

In his premiership, Tusk has proposed various reforms to the Polish constitution. In 2009, Tusk proposed changes to the power of the presidency, by abolishing the presidential veto. "The president should not have veto power. People make their decision in elections and then state institutions should not be in conflict," said Tusk. Tusk again reiterated his desire for constitutional reform in February 2010, proposing that the presidential veto be overridden by a simple parliamentary majority rather than through a three-fifths vote. "Presidential veto could not effectively block the will of the majority in parliament, which won elections and formed the government," stated Tusk. Further constitutional reforms proposed by Tusk include reducing the Sejm from a membership of 460 to 300, "not only because of its savings, but also the excessive number of members' causes blurring certain plans and projects". Similarly, Tusk proposed radical changes to the Senate, preferring to abolish the upper house altogether, yet due to constitutional concerns and demands from the junior coalition Polish People's Party partner, Tusk proposed reducing the Senate from 100 to 49, while including former presidents to sit in the Senate for political experience and expertise in state matters. Parliamentary immunity for all members of the Sejm and Senate would also be stripped, except for in special situations. In addition, Tusk proposed that the prime minister's role in foreign policy decisions would be greatly expanded. By decreasing the president's role in governance, executive power would further be concentrated in the prime minister, directly responsible to the cabinet and Sejm, as well as avoiding confusion over Poland's representation at international or EU summits. The opposition conservative Law and Justice party deeply criticised Tusk's constitutional reform proposals, opting in opposing legislation for the presidency to garner greater power over the prime minister.

In an interview with the Financial Times in January 2010, Tusk was asked if he considered running again as Civic Platform's candidate for that year's presidential election. Tusk replied that although the presidential election typically drew the most voters to the polls and remained Poland's most high-profiled race, the presidency had little political power outside of the veto, and preferred to remain as prime minister. While not formally excluding his candidacy, Tusk declared that "I would very much like to continue to work in the government and Civic Platform, because that seems to me to be the key element in ensuring success in the civilisational race in which we are engaged." A day after the interview, Tusk formally announced his intention of staying as prime minister, allowing his party to choose another candidate (and eventual winner), Bronisław Komorowski.

Honors and awards
The Charlemagne Prize of the city of Aachen was awarded to Tusk on 13 May 2010 for his merits in the further unification of Europe and for his role as a "patriot and great European". He dedicated the prize to the people killed in a plane crash of a Polish Air Force Tu-154 in April 2010 including the Polish president Lech Kaczyński. The eulogy was given by German chancellor Angela Merkel.

In May 2012, he received the Walther-Rathenau-Preis "in recognition for his commitment to European integration during Poland's Presidency of the Council of the EU in the second half of 2011 and for fostering Polish–German dialogue". In her speech German chancellor Merkel praised Tusk as "a farsighted European". In the same year, he also received the European Prize for Political Culture. In December 2017, he was awarded an honorary doctorate at the University of Pécs, Hungary, in recognition of Tusk's "achievements as a Polish and European politician, which are strongly connected with Hungarian, regional and European history". On 16 December 2018, Tusk was awarded an honorary doctorate at the TU Dortmund University, Germany, "in recognition of his services to European politics and his contribution to the debate on European values". In 2019, he was awarded an honorary doctorate at the University of Lviv, Ukraine, which he accepted on the fifth anniversary of the Revolution of Dignity.

 Grand Cross Order of the Sun (2008, Peru)
 Grand Cross of the Royal Norwegian Order of Merit (2012, Norway)
 Presidential Order of Excellence (Georgia, 2013)
 Order of the Cross of Terra Mariana (2014, Estonia)
 The First Class of the Order of Prince Yaroslav the Wise (2019, Ukraine)
 Grand Cordon of the Order of the Rising Sun (2021, Japan)

President of the European Council (2014–2019)

Tusk succeeded Herman Van Rompuy as President of the European Council on 1 December 2014.

Since assuming office, Tusk has notably worked to promote a unified European response to Russia's military intervention in Ukraine. 
Tusk made attempts to co-ordinate the EU's response to the European migrant crisis, and warned illegal economic migrants not to come to Europe.
Ahead of the UK's EU membership referendum Tusk warned of dire consequences should the UK vote to leave. After the vote he pursued a hard line on the UK's withdrawal from the European Union stating that the country's only real alternative to a "hard Brexit" is "no Brexit". In September 2018 he caused controversy after his official Instagram account posted an image of himself handing a slice of cake to British Prime Minister Theresa May, with the caption "A piece of cake, perhaps? Sorry, no cherries." Tusk has opposed the Nord Stream 2 gas pipeline from Russia to Germany.

On 31 January 2017, Tusk wrote an open letter to the 27 EU heads of state or government on the future of the EU before the Malta summit. In this letter, he stated the Trump administration presented a threat to the EU on a par with a newly assertive China, an aggressive Russia and "wars, terror and anarchy in the Middle East and Africa".

On 9 March 2017, Tusk was re-elected for a second term to run until 30 November 2019. He received 27 of 28 votes; the one vote against him came from Beata Szydło, the Prime Minister of Poland. Tusk's actions in the wake of the 2010 plane crash that killed then-Polish President Lech Kaczyński provoked opposition from Poland's governing right-wing party—critics said that Tusk's centrist government did not sufficiently investigate the cause of the crash. Szydło refused to sign the EU statement issued at the end of the council's meeting in protest at Tusk's reelection, though other EU leaders spoke in favour of him; Prime Minister Mark Rutte of the Netherlands called him "a very good president", and European Commission President Jean-Claude Juncker and German chancellor Angela Merkel both made statements supporting the vote. Donald Tusk maintains there will be no winners from Brexit and the two years following the triggering of Article 50 will be a time of damage limitation.

In February 2018, Tusk urged Turkey "to avoid threats or actions against any EU member and instead commit to good neighbourly relations, peaceful dispute settlement and respect for territorial sovereignty." Tusk also expressed concern over the Turkish invasion of northern Syria in 2018. In response to the death of Chinese Nobel Peace Prize laureate Liu Xiaobo, who died of organ failure while in government custody, Tusk and Jean-Claude Juncker said in a joint statement that they had learned of Liu's death "with deep sadness".

On 6 February 2019, Tusk held talks with Irish Premier Leo Varadkar in Brussels to discuss Britain's departure from the European Union, stating that there was a "special place in Hell for those who promoted Brexit without even a sketch of a plan how to carry it out safely". Tusk opened his statement by saying there were 50 days to go until the UK's exit from the EU: "I know that still a very great number of people in the UK, and on the continent, as well as in Ireland, wish for a reversal of this decision. I have always been with you, with all my heart. But the facts are unmistakable. At the moment, the pro-Brexit stance of the UK Prime Minister, and the Leader of the Opposition, rules out this question. Today, there is no political force and no effective leadership for Remain. I say this without satisfaction, but you can't argue with the facts." On 24 August 2019 in Biarritz for the G7 Summit, Tusk addressed reporters regarding Brexit, stating "one thing I will not cooperate on is no deal." He also said he hoped that Boris Johnson would not go down in history as 'Mr No Deal'. In September 2019, Tusk said that the EU should open accession talks with both Albania and North Macedonia.

Tusk condemned the 2019 Turkish offensive into north-eastern Syria. He reprimanded Turkish President Tayyip Erdogan for threatening to send millions of Syrian refugees to Europe and denounced the Turkish operation in northern Syria as destabilizing the region, which he demanded to halt.

Writing of his tenure as President of the European Council, LSE political scientist Sara Hagemann said "he set the tone for a liberal and progressive agenda at a time of significant threat from populist and pro-Russian voices in Europe."

Return to Polish politics

In July 2021, Tusk relocated to Warsaw and resumed an active role in Polish politics as leader of Civic Platform. As of May 2022, he was the preferred choice of the Polish public among opposition figures for the position of future Prime Minister. However, he has -24.4% net approval among voters at large.

Personal life
Donald Tusk married Małgorzata Sochacka in 1978. They have two children: a son, Michał and a daughter, Katarzyna.

Tusk belongs to the Kashubian minority in Poland. In an interview with the Israeli newspaper Haaretz in December 2008, Tusk compared his own family history to the Jewish experience, describing the Kashubian minority as a people who, "like the Jews, are people who were born and live in border areas and were suspected by the Nazis and by the Communists of being disloyal".

Upon acceding to his position as President of the European Council Tusk was criticized for his poor English skills and lack of knowledge of French. Other sources however argue that he is "quite good" at English, and he underwent extensive language classes in advance of assuming the role of President. On 10 January 2019, Tusk gave a seven-minute speech only in Romanian at the Romanian Athenaeum in Bucharest at the ceremony that marked the beginning of Romania's EU Council Presidency. His delivery received loud applause. On 12 December 2019, Tusk published a diary "Szczerze", based on his five-year-term as President of the European Council, which became a bestseller in Poland. He assumed the office of the President of the European People’s Party on 1 December 2019, a day after leaving office as President of the European Council. On 1 June 2022 he stepped down from the position and was replaced by Manfred Weber.

Tusk's religious views became a matter of a debate during his presidential campaign in 2005. To avoid further speculation, just before the presidential elections Tusk requested a Catholic marriage ceremony with his wife Małgorzata, whom he had married in a civil ceremony 27 years earlier.

See also
First Cabinet of Donald Tusk
Second Cabinet of Donald Tusk
History of Poland (1989–present)
List of political parties in Poland
List of politicians in Poland
Politics of Poland
List of Poles
2005 Polish presidential election
2005 Polish parliamentary election
2007 Polish parliamentary election
2011 Polish parliamentary election

References

External links

Prime Minister | Council of Ministers | The Chancellery of the Prime Minister 
European Council President

|-

|-

|-

|-

1957 births
Candidates in the 2005 Polish presidential election
Civic Platform politicians
European conservative liberals
Grand Cordons of the Order of the Rising Sun
Living people
Deputy Marshals of the Sejm of the Third Polish Republic
Members of the Polish Sejm 1991–1993
Members of the Polish Sejm 2001–2005
Members of the Polish Sejm 2005–2007
Members of the Polish Sejm 2007–2011
Members of the Senate of Poland 1997–2001
People from Sopot
Presidents of the European People's Party
Political party founders
Polish people of Kashubian descent
Polish people of German descent
Polish Roman Catholics
Politicians from Gdańsk
Presidents of the European Council
Prime Ministers of Poland
Recipients of the Order of Prince Yaroslav the Wise, 1st class
Recipients of the Order of the Cross of Terra Mariana, 1st Class
Recipients of the Order of the Sun of Peru
Recipients of the Presidential Order of Excellence
University of Gdańsk alumni